Andrew B. Dougherty (October 17, 1863 –January 8, 1928) was a Canadian-born American politician.

Early life
Dougherty was born on October 17, 1863, in Saint John, New Brunswick, Canada. His father was Archibald K. Dougherty. Dougherty's family moved to Michigan when he was five years old.

Career
In 1899, Dougherty was a member of the Michigan Republican State Central Committee. In 1904, Dougherty  was a delegate to Republican National Convention from Michigan. In 1912, unsuccessfully ran as a candidate for presidential elector for Michigan. Dougherty was appointed to the position of Michigan Attorney General in 1923, and he served in that position until 1926.

Death
Dougherty died on January 8, 1928, in Lansing, Michigan. He was interred at Maple Grove Cemetery in Elk Rapids, Michigan.

References

1863 births
1928 deaths
Michigan Attorneys General
Michigan Republicans
Politicians from Saint John, New Brunswick
Burials in Michigan
20th-century American politicians
20th-century American lawyers